Dawid Kellerman is a South African rugby union player for the  in the Currie Cup. His regular position is centre.

He made his debut in the same fixture, starting the match at inside centre.

References

South African rugby union players
Living people
Rugby union centres
Blue Bulls players
Year of birth missing (living people)
Bulls (rugby union) players
Mie Honda Heat players
Rugby sevens players at the 2018 Summer Youth Olympics